Interstate 69W (I-69W) is a relatively short north–south Interstate Highway running through South Texas in the United States. The freeway begins northeast of the middle of World Trade International Bridge in Laredo and ends at I-35. In the future, I-69W will head northeast for  before terminating near Victoria as both I-69E and I-69W merge to form I-69. For its entire length, I-69W runs concurrently with US Highway 59 (US 59).

Route description

The Federal Highway Administration (FHWA) approved the designation of a  section of freeway in Laredo as part of I-69W. The congressionally designated I-69W corridor begins at the Mexican border on the World Trade International Bridge, which connects to Mexican Federal Highway 85D, at the border in Laredo. It is cosigned with both US 59 and State Highway Loop 20 (Loop 20; Bob Bullock Loop) and extends  to I-35 (which connects to Mexican Federal Highway 85 south of the border).

In the future, I-69W will continue along US 59 east to George West, where it will intersect I-69C. It will then intersect I-37 east of George West and continue east to Victoria, where it will meet with I-69E and continue toward Houston as I-69. The completed I-69W will measure .

History
The Intermodal Surface Transportation Efficiency Act of 1991 included two High Priority Corridors that would later become parts of a proposed cross-country extension of I-69:
 (18) Corridor from Indianapolis, Indiana, to Memphis, Tennessee, via Evansville, Indiana.
 (20) US 59 Corridor from Laredo, Texas, through Houston, Texas, to the vicinity of Texarkana, Texas.
The National Highway System Designation Act of 1995 made further amendments to the description of Corridor 18, specifying that it would serve Mississippi and Arkansas, extending it south to the Mexican border in the Lower Rio Grande Valley, and adding a short connection at Brownsville, Texas. This act also specified that Corridors 18 and 20 were "future parts of the Interstate System", to become actual Interstates when built to Interstate standards and connected to other Interstates.

The Transportation Equity Act for the 21st Century (TEA-21), enacted in 1998, greatly expanded the extension to the Lower Rio Grande Valley was detailed as splitting into two routes just south of Victoria, one following US 77 and the other following US 59 and US 281 to the Rio Grande. This act also assigned the I-69 designation to Corridors 18 and 20, with the branches on US 77, US 281, and US 59 to the Rio Grande being "Interstate 69 East", "Interstate 69 Central", and "Interstate 69 West", respectively. With TEA-21, the I-69 extension took shape and remains today as those segments.

Exit list

See also

References

External links

W
U.S. Route 59
Interstate Highways in Texas
Interstate 69W
Interstate 69W
Interstate 69W
Interstate 69W
Interstate 69W
Interstate 69W
Interstate 69W